The 2021 Illinois Fighting Illini football team represented the University of Illinois at Urbana–Champaign in the 2021 NCAA Division I FBS football season. The Fighting Illini played their home games at Memorial Stadium in Champaign, Illinois, and competed in the West Division of the Big Ten Conference. They were led by first-year head coach Bret Bielema. The Illini finished the season 5–7, 4–5 in Big Ten play to finish in fifth place in the West division.

The team's 20–18 victory over No. 7-ranked Penn State set a NCAA record for the most overtime periods in one game, with nine.

Coaching staff

Schedule

Roster

Game summaries

Nebraska

Sources:

UTSA

Virginia

Maryland

Purdue

Charlotte

Sources:

Wisconsin

Penn State

Rutgers

No. 20 Minnesota

No. 17 Iowa

Source: Box Score

Northwestern

 Illinois-Northwestern football rivalry

References

Illinois
Illinois Fighting Illini football seasons
Illinois Fighting Illini football